Hamburg Towers, for sponsorship reasons named Veolia Towers Hamburg, is a professional basketball team, based in Hamburg, Germany. The Towers are currently playing in the Basketball Bundesliga, after promoting from the ProA in 2019.

Founded in 2013, the club played in the ProA from the 2014–15 season. In 2019, Hamburg promoted to the BBL for the first time. Since 2014, their home arena is the Edel-optics.de Arena in Wilhelmsburg. It has capacity for 3,400 people.

History
In February 2013, former player Pascal Roller and entrepreneur Wolfgang Sahm announced their plans to bring back professional basketball to Hamburg. There had been no professional basketball in the city since the bankruptcy of BCJ Hamburg in 2002. The original goal of the club was to obtain a wild card for the first tier Basketball Bundesliga. However, the team was given a spot in the second tier ProA.

The club debuted in the 2014–15 ProA season. It played its first home game on 28 September 2014, and won 66–65 over Gießen 46ers. In its debut season, the team ended eight in the standings. In the 2015–16 season, the Towers had the highest average attendance of all ProA clubs with 3,047 per game.

In the 2018–19 season, Hamburg finished the regular season in the fourth place. On 30 April 2019, Hamburg Towers promoted to the Basketball Bundesliga for the first time after defeating first-seeded Chemnitz Niners in the playoffs semifinals, and thus reaching the ProA Finals. On 4 May 2019, the team won the ProA championship after defeating Nürnberg Falcons in the second leg.

Sponsorships 
In 2022, the Towers signed a sponsorship agreement with Veolia to become their name sponsor in the 2022–23 season.

Season by season

Honours

Titles: 1
ProA
Winners (1): 2018–19

Players

Current roster

Notable players

Head coaches

Arena

Since 2013: Edel-optics.de Arena (capacity: 3,400)

References

External links

2013 establishments in Germany
Basketball teams established in 2013
Basketball teams in Germany
Towers